Trek-80 is a computer game developed by Judges Guild in 1979 for the TRS-80.

Plot
The object of Trek-80 is to destroy all the Klingon vessels while losing no more than five supply tugs in a specified period of time. The player moves the ship using warp drive for galactic travel, and impulse drive for inner quadrant movement. The Enterprise and Klingon vessels are armed with phasers and photon torpedoes, while the supply tugs only have phasers. The Enterprise also has the ability to use the ram as a weapon.

Gameplay

The graphic layout is the usual galactic grid overlaid by an 8 × 8 quadrant grid found in Trek games. The Enterprise is depicted by an "E", and Klingons by a "K", and the tugs by the up arrow. Additional information displayed on-screen includes: stardate, ship's condition, quadrant, ship's energy, bases, torpedoes, and number of tugs lost.

Development
As part of their plan to compete with TSR, Judges Guild increased production on their print products, and they also started to diversify by moving into computer game production, although Trek-80 (1979) was their only computer game.

Trek-80 was a basic language, 16K program written by Bruce Berry, and was the first computer game produced by a science-fiction/fantasy wargaming company. Barry took many ideas from the numerous Trek programs already on the market, and added a few new and different twists.

Reception
The game was reviewed in 1980 in The Dragon #36 by Michael Dodge. Dodge concluded the review with, "Trek-80 is a well written program and a good Star Trek game. The program's graphics are well laid out and easy to read, the mechanics are adequate, and the introductions of ramming and tugs are excellent features".

References

1979 video games
Judges Guild publications
TRS-80 games
TRS-80-only games
Video games based on Star Trek
Video games developed in the United States